In Greek mythology, the name Hyperbius (Ancient Greek: Ὑπέρβιος Ὑpérvios means "of overwhelming strength") may refer to:

Hyperbius, son of Ares, reputedly the first to have killed an animal.
Hyperbius, son of Aegyptus, who married and was killed by the Danaid Celaeno, or by Eupheme.
Hyperbius, son of Oenops, a defender of Thebes in the war of the Seven against Thebes, appointed by Eteocles to defend the Oncaidian Gate against Hippomedon. He had an image of Zeus on his shield.
Hyperbius, an Athenian, brother of Agrolas or Euryalus. The two brothers were credited with inventing the technique of building with bricks, and with construction of the first brick houses in Athens, as well as of the wall around Acropolis.
Hyperbius, a Corinthian credited with invention of the potter's wheel.

Notes

References 

 Aeschylus, translated in two volumes. 1. Seven Against Thebes by Herbert Weir Smyth, Ph. D. Cambridge, MA. Harvard University Press. 1926. Online version at the Perseus Digital Library. Greek text available from the same website.
 Apollodorus, The Library with an English Translation by Sir James George Frazer, F.B.A., F.R.S. in 2 Volumes, Cambridge, MA, Harvard University Press; London, William Heinemann Ltd. 1921. ISBN 0-674-99135-4. Online version at the Perseus Digital Library. Greek text available from the same website.
 Gaius Julius Hyginus, Fabulae from The Myths of Hyginus translated and edited by Mary Grant. University of Kansas Publications in Humanistic Studies. Online version at the Topos Text Project.
 Pausanias, Description of Greece with an English Translation by W.H.S. Jones, Litt.D., and H.A. Ormerod, M.A., in 4 Volumes. Cambridge, MA, Harvard University Press; London, William Heinemann Ltd. 1918. . Online version at the Perseus Digital Library
 Pausanias, Graeciae Descriptio. 3 vols. Leipzig, Teubner. 1903.  Greek text available at the Perseus Digital Library.
 Pliny the Elder, The Natural History. John Bostock, M.D., F.R.S. H.T. Riley, Esq., B.A. London. Taylor and Francis, Red Lion Court, Fleet Street. 1855. Online version at the Perseus Digital Library.
 Pliny the Elder, Naturalis Historia. Karl Friedrich Theodor Mayhoff. Lipsiae. Teubner. 1906. Latin text available at the Perseus Digital Library.

Children of Ares
Demigods in classical mythology
Princes in Greek mythology
Sons of Aegyptus
Ancient Greek inventors
Theban characters in Greek mythology
Characters in Seven against Thebes